Bachvarov (feminine form Bachvarova) is a Bulgarian surname. Notable persons with that name include:

Iliya Bachvarov (born 1943), Bulgarian hockey player
Marin Bachvarov (born 1947), Bulgarian hockey player
Mikhail Bachvarov (1935–2009), Bulgarian sprinter
Radoslava Bachvarova (born 1987), Bulgarian basketball player
Rumyana Bachvarova (born 1959), Bulgarian politician
Todor Bachvarov (born 1932), Bulgarian gymnast

Bulgarian-language surnames